Springdale High School is a public high school in Springdale, Arkansas, United States for students in grades ten through twelve. Springdale High School is one of three high schools administered by the Springdale School District, the others being Har-Ber High School and Don Tyson School of Innovation.

Springdale High's zone, as of 2006, includes sections of Springdale (including most of the former municipality of Bethel Heights), and portions of Fayetteville and Goshen.

Notable people

Alumni
Carolyn Pollan '55 - longest serving Republican and longest serving woman member of the Arkansas House of Representatives; resides in Fort Smith
Mitch Mustain '06 - former University of Arkansas and University of Southern California quarterback
Damian Williams '06 - former Arkansas and University of Southern California wide receiver. In the 2010 NFL Draft, Williams was selected with the 77th pick by the Tennessee Titans.

Staff
Gus Malzahn - Former football coach, went on to be head coach at Auburn and UCF.
Eliah Drinkwitz - Former assistant football coach, went on to be head coach at Appalachian State and Missouri.

References

External links 

1940 establishments in Arkansas
Educational institutions established in 1940
International Baccalaureate schools in Arkansas
Public high schools in Arkansas
Schools in Washington County, Arkansas
Buildings and structures in Springdale, Arkansas